Vladimir Mikhaylovich Barnashov (born 26 February 1951) is a Soviet former biathlete.

Life and career
Barnashov was born in the village of Ryazany, Muromtsevsky District, Omsk Oblast

He trained at Dynamo sports society and was a member of the USSR National Biathlon Team from 1977. At the 1980 Olympics in Lake Placid he won a gold medal with the Soviet relay team. He was also a bronze medalist in the USSR 4 × 7.5 km relay team at the 1979, 1981 and 1982 Biathlon World Championships. In the overall World Cup he came third overall in the 1978–79 season behind Klaus Siebert and Frank Ullrich.

He was a coach of the USSR National Biathlon Team between 1984 and 1992, training six Olympic Champions in biathlon and becoming the Honoured Trainer of the USSR in 1988.

Barnashov graduated from Omsk State Institute for Physical Culture in 1980 and is currently head coach of Russian biathlon team.

Honours and awards
Barnashov was awarded the Order of the Badge of Honour in 1980, and in 1988 he received the Medal "For Labour Valour". Between 1992 and 1998 Barnashov was the head coach of the Croatian National Cross-Country Skiing Team.

He was also awarded the Medal of the Order of Merit for the Fatherland, 2nd class (October 21, 2010), for the successful preparation of the athletes who achieved high sport achievements at the XXI Olympic Winter Games of 2010 in Vancouver, Canada.

Barnashov has also been given the honorary sports titles of Honored Master of Sports, Honored coach of the USSR and Honoured Coach of Russia.

Biathlon results
All results are sourced from the International Biathlon Union.

Olympic Games
1 medal (1 gold)

World Championships
3 medals (3 bronze)

*During Olympic seasons competitions are only held for those events not included in the Olympic program.

Individual victories
2 victories (1 In, 1 Sp)

*Results are from UIPMB and IBU races which include the Biathlon World Cup, Biathlon World Championships and the Winter Olympic Games.

References

External links
 
 
 

1951 births
Living people
People from Muromtsevsky District
Dynamo sports society athletes
Soviet male biathletes
Biathletes at the 1980 Winter Olympics
Olympic biathletes of the Soviet Union
Medalists at the 1980 Winter Olympics
Olympic medalists in biathlon
Olympic gold medalists for the Soviet Union
Biathlon World Championships medalists